NGC 3156 is a lenticular galaxy located in the constellation Sextans. It is located at a distance of about 75 million light-years from Earth and is forming a pair with NGC 3169. It was discovered by astronomer William Herschel on December 13, 1784.

It is a member of the NGC 3166 Group of galaxies, which is a member of the Leo II Groups, a series of galaxies and galaxy clusters strung out from the right edge of the Virgo Supercluster.

Gallery

References

External links 
 

Sextans (constellation)
3156
Lenticular galaxies
029730